Uwe Harttgen (born 6 July 1964) is a German former professional footballer who played as a midfielder. He spent six seasons in the Bundesliga with SV Werder Bremen. After his career as an active player, he earned a PhD in psychology and became youth team coordinator for his club SV Werder Bremen.

Career

As a player
Harttgen began his career as an adult footballer, unusually for a later professional, in the Kreisklasse B, where he played with friends as a recreational athlete. His first semi-professional stop was then Oberliga club FC Mahndorf, where he was discovered at the age of 23 by SV Werder Bremen for the second team, who were looking for an older leading player. Two years later, during the 1989/90 season, Harttgen was used for the first time in the Bundesliga by the Bremen club. Harttgen was able to fight his way into the regular squad in the second half of the season. He remained a regular during Bremen's great period in the early 1990s, but in the 1993/94 season he was only able to play a single game in the Bundesliga due to health issues. Harttgen moved to Hannover 96 in the 2. Bundesliga in 1994, for this club he made 37 appearances in two years and scored 4 goals. During the 1995/96 season he went back to SV Werder, where he played mainly in the second team. In 1997/98 he made five more Bundesliga appearances. In total, he made 82 appearances and scored 15 goals in the first division.

As a psychologist and official
Harttgen was initially employed as a graduate psychologist at SV Werder Bremen's youth development center before replacing the club's youth manager, Wolf Werner, in the summer of 2007. On July 5, 2007, Harttgen also succeeded Werner on the regional league committee as representative for the second teams of Bundesliga clubs.

On 14 November 2012, the DFL announced that Harttgen would also take up the post of chairman of the Performance Centers Commission there on 1 January 2013, therefore succeeding Andreas Rettig.

On 8 May 2013, Werder announced that it had parted ways with Harttgen by mutual consent due to differences of opinion regarding the future promotion of young talent.

On 9 January 2014, regional league club Rot-Weiss Essen announced the signing of Uwe Harttgen as their new sporting director from 1 February 2014.[4] However, on 24 March 2015, Harttgen was summarily dismissed after allegedly extending the contract with coach Marc Fascher, contrary to the instructions of the supervisory board.

Other
In 2011, Harttgen completed a doctorate in psychology at the University of Bremen on the topic of psychological aspects of the development of youth competitive footballers.

Honours
Werder Bremen
 UEFA Cup Winners' Cup: 1991–92
 Bundesliga: 1992–93
 DFB-Pokal: 1990–91, 1993–94
 DFB-Pokal finalist: 1989–90

References

External links
 
 

Living people
1964 births
Footballers from Bremen
German footballers
Association football midfielders
SV Werder Bremen players
Hannover 96 players
SV Werder Bremen II players
FC Oberneuland players
Bundesliga players
2. Bundesliga players
West German footballers